Vika may refer to:


Persons
 often a short form of Victoria (and variants) in Eastern Europe
 Vika Lusibaea (born 1964), Solomon Islands politician
 Hilda Vīka (1897–1963), Latvian artist and writer
 Ludo Vika (born 1955), Dominican Republic actress
 Vika Bull, one of an Australian vocal duo of sisters, Vika and Linda

Places
 Vika, Oslo, a neighborhood in the Frogner borough of Oslo, Norway
 Vika Line, a railway line in Vika, Oslo
 Vika, Troms, a village near Harstad, Norway
 Vika, Sweden, a village in Falun, Sweden
 Vika Court District, or Vika tingslag, former district in Dalecarlia, Sweden
 Vika, the Hungarian name for the village of Vica in Gurasada, Romania

Other
 Vikafestivalen, a Norwegian pop music festival
 VIKA, another name for Kanpur Airport in India
 Vika oxygen generator, a life-support system for spaceflight
 The vika, Uromys vika, a rodent unique to the island of Vangunu, Solomon Islands

See also
 Vikas (disambiguation)
 Viken (disambiguation)